Rogelio Castañeda Jr (born September 8, 1979) is a Mexican professional boxer who competes at welterweight. He is a former WBC FECARBOX and IBA light welterweight champion.

Pro career
In June 2001, Rogelio upset an undefeated Frankie Santos by K.O. to win the WBC FECARBOX Light Welterweight Championship, the bout was held at the Miccosukee Indian Gaming Resort in Miami, Florida.

IBA Light Welterweight Championship
On May 27, 2005 Castañeda beat title contender Tomas Barrientes to win the IBA Light Welterweight Championship.

Professional record

|- style="margin:0.5em auto; font-size:95%;"
| style="text-align:center;" colspan="8"|26 Wins (8 Knockouts), 22 Defeats, 3 Draws, 1 No Contest
|-  style="text-align:center; margin:0.5em auto; font-size:95%; background:#e3e3e3;"
|  style="border-style:none none solid solid; "|Res.
|  style="border-style:none none solid solid; "|Record
|  style="border-style:none none solid solid; "|Opponent
|  style="border-style:none none solid solid; "|Type
|  style="border-style:none none solid solid; "|Rd., Time
|  style="border-style:none none solid solid; "|Date
|  style="border-style:none none solid solid; "|Location
|  style="border-style:none none solid solid; "|Notes
|- align=center
|Loss || 26-22-3 ||align=left| Steve Claggett
||| 3  ||  ||align=left|
|align=left|
|- align=center
|Loss || 26-21-3 ||align=left| Michael Anderson
||| 8 ||  ||align=left|
|align=left|
|- align=center
|Loss || 26-20-3 ||align=left| Jonathan Chicas
||| 4  ||  ||align=left|
|align=left|
|- align=center
|Loss || 26-19-3 ||align=left| Konstantin Ponomarev
||| 3  ||  ||align=left|
|align=left|
|- align=center
|Loss || 26-18-3 ||align=left| Hector Serrano
||| 8  ||  ||align=left|
|align=left|
|- align=center
|Loss || 26-17-3 ||align=left| Oscar Godoy
||| 2  ||  ||align=left|
|align=left|
|- align=center
|Loss || 26-16-3 ||align=left| Lucas Matthysse
||| 1  ||  ||align=left|
|align=left|
|- align=center
|Win || 26-15-3 ||align=left| Edgar Quiroz
||| 4  ||  ||align=left|
|align=left|
|- align=center
|Win || 25-15-3 || align=left| Juan Ruiz
||| 4  ||  ||align=left|
|align=left|
|- align=center
|Loss || 24-15-3 ||align=left| Sirimongkol Singmanasak
||| 8  ||  ||align=left|
|align=left|
|- align=center
| style="background:#ddd;"|NC || 24-14-3 ||align=left| Lucas Matthysse
| || 3  ||  ||align=left|
|align=left|
|- align=center
|Loss || 24-14-3 ||align=left| Lamont Peterson
||| 9  ||  ||align=left|
|align=left|
|- align=center
|Win || 24-13-3 ||align=left| Ubaldo Hernandez
||| 10  ||  ||align=left|
|align=left|
|- align=center
|Loss || 23-13-3 ||align=left| Demetrius Hopkins
||| 12  ||  ||align=left|
|align=left|
|- align=center

See also
List of Mexican boxing world champions

References

External links

Boxers from Baja California
Sportspeople from Tijuana
Light-welterweight boxers
1976 births
Living people
Mexican male boxers